Get Up! was the first single taken from Beverley Knight's third studio album, Who I Am. The track, which was showcased with a performance at the 2001 MOBO Awards, became Knight's third top 20 hit in Britain when it peaked at #17 upon its release.

The accompanying promo video was directed by Jason Smith.

Track list
CD 1
"Get Up!"
"Get Up!" (Middle Row Mix)
"Get Up!" (So Solid Crew Mix)

CD 2
"Get Up!"
"Never Too Late" (Beverley Knight)
"What If?" (Beverley Knight)

Charts

Personnel
Written by Beverley Knight, Derrick Joshua and Derrick Martin
Lyrics by Beverley Knight
Initial production by Beverley Knight, Derrick Joshua and Derrick Martin.
Produced by BJ and Mike Soul
All vocals performed and arranged by Beverley Knight
Mixed by Mike 'Spike' Drake. Assisted by Jeff Knowler

See also
Beverley Knight discography

References

2001 singles
Beverley Knight songs
Songs written by Beverley Knight
2001 songs
Parlophone singles